Sauder Woodworking Company is a furniture manufacturing business that started in 1934 making kitchen cabinets.

History 
Erie J. Sauder started the company at the age of 30 in a barn located behind where he lived. A year later, due to the success of his company, he moved to a larger facility in Archbold, Ohio, the same town where he was born. At that time he had five employees. His main customer base was locals and the nearby area. In 1937 the business expanded again, then manufacturing church pews.

From the scrap wood of the church pews he began manufacturing low-priced wooden tables. The "leftovers" however were expensive quality wood. In 1940 a couple of traveling salesmen noticed these inexpensive tables of oak, maple, and walnut while at Sauder's business. They were captivated by this concept of using leftovers to produce low-priced tables. They asked if they could take some of these tables to a furniture show in Chicago. Soon afterwards they came back, to the astonishment of Sauder, with an order for 25,000 tables. He obtained a loan from a local bank and doubled the size of his manufacturing business to accommodate the order.

An idea came up from the Federal Department Store chain that if Sauder could come up with "knock-down" furniture that would lie flat in a box it would reduce shipping and inventory storage costs and increase profits. From that idea, he conceived a "snap together" knock-down table in a box that customers could put together at home. To save customers money, he developed a set of wooden parts of the tables he manufactured that were unassembled as furniture in a box. These parts would be boxed in a flat package ready for the customer to take home and assemble themselves—thus saving on labor costs of a factory assembled unit. This knock-down table concept he created in 1951 and patented a year later, where it became the start of the ready-to-assemble furniture industry. The snap-together furniture was a type of ready-to-assemble furniture, which along with the church furniture, sold well under the name of Foremost Furniture. In the 1980s the name of the products was changed to Sauder Woodworking, which it is known by today.

Patent 
Erie J. Sauder's first snap-together furniture piece was an occasional table created in 1951. The style of furniture became the first patented ready-to-assemble furniture design and started the industry. The knock-down table was filed for patent on July 1, 1952, and received final patent approval August 25, 1953. This patent was the basis for Sauder Woodworking Company to become the largest maker of ready-to-assemble furniture in the country.

Material 
Sauder's snap-together furniture is usually made of panels made of particle board. The panels are normally laminated to make them appear like real wood. They are drilled, notched, and grooved to accept the hardware furnished. The customer assembles the furniture themselves at home with screwdrivers, wrenches, and a hammer.

References

External links 

Furniture companies of the United States
Manufacturing companies established in 1934
1934 establishments in Ohio
Fulton County, Ohio
Manufacturing companies based in Ohio